Dromedary Glacier is a small alpine glacier occupying a high cirque on the east side of Mount Dromedary in the Royal Society Range. It was named by the Victoria University of Wellington Antarctic Expedition (1960–61) for its proximity to Mount Dromedary.

References 

Glaciers of Victoria Land
Scott Coast